Sklyarov is a surname of Russian origin. 
People with this name include:
 Aleksandr Valeryevich Sklyarov (born 1971), is a former Kazakhstani football player.
 Andrei Vladimirovich Sklyarov (born 1989), is a Russian professional footballer. 
 Dmitry Sklyarov (born 1974), a Russian citizen employed by the Russian company ElcomSoft 
 Igor Sklyarov (born 1966), is a former Russian footballer.
 Ivan Sklyarov (1948–2007), was a Russian politician.
 Yuri Sklyarov (1925–2013), is a CPSU party member since 1944, a candidate member of the Central Committee (1981-1989), Deputy of the Supreme Soviet of the USSR 11 convocation.

Russian-language surnames